Rock the Garden was an annual summer music festival organized by the Walker Art Center and Minnesota Public Radio held in Minneapolis, Minnesota that ran from 1998 - 2022. Launched by the Walker in 1998, the event was cosponsored by 89.3 The Current and Minnesota Public Radio after 2008, becoming more of an indie rock festival. Since its founding, Rock the Garden has highlighted national artists such as Wilco, Sonic Youth, David Byrne, MGMT, De La Soul, My Morning Jacket, Spoon,  Bon Iver, and The Decemberists, and featured a diverse range of local bands like Low, Doomtree, Fog, Iffy, Cloud Cult, Howler, and Trampled By Turtles.

Lineups

1998
Hot Head Swing Band
The Jayhawks

2000
Sunship Sextet
Stereolab
Sonic Youth

2002
Iffy
Marc Ribot and Los Cubanos Postizos
Medeski Martin & Wood

2003
Fog
The Bad Plus
Wilco

2004
Barbara Cohen
Antibalas Afrobeat Orchestra
David Byrne

2008
Rock the Garden 2008 was held on June 21.
Bon Iver
Cloud Cult
The New Pornographers
Andrew Bird

2009
Rock the Garden 2009 was held on June 19 and featured a new stage location facing the hill instead of the street.
Solid Gold
Yeasayer
Calexico
The Decemberists

2010
Rock the Garden 2010 was held on June 19.
Retribution Gospel Choir
OK Go
Sharon Jones & The Dap-Kings
MGMT

2011
Rock the Garden 2011 was held on June 18.
Tapes 'n Tapes
Booker T. Jones
Neko Case
My Morning Jacket

2012
Rock the Garden 2012 was held on June 16.
Howler
Tune-Yards
Doomtree
Trampled by Turtles
The Hold Steady

2013
Rock the Garden 2013 was held on June 15.
Dan Deacon
Low
Bob Mould
Silversun Pickups
Metric

2014

Rock the Garden 2014 was held on June 21 and June 22.

Saturday
Lizzo
Jeremy Messersmith
Best Coast
Matt & Kim
De La Soul

Sunday
Valerie June
Kurt Vile and The Violators
Dessa
Guided By Voices
Spoon

2015
Rock the Garden 2015 was held on June 20 and June 21.

Saturday
thestand4rd
Lucius
Courtney Barnett
Conor Oberst
Belle and Sebastian

Sunday
The Ghost of a Saber Tooth Tiger
JD McPherson
Seun Kuti and Egypt 80
Babes in Toyland
Modest Mouse

2016
Rock the Garden 2016 was held June 18 at Boom Island Park (due to construction on the Walker Art Center campus).
Plague Vendor
GRRRL PRTY
Nathaniel Rateliff & the Night Sweats
Hippo Campus
M. Ward
Poliça
Chance the Rapper
The Flaming Lips

2017
Rock the Garden 2017 was held July 22 in the newly renovated Minneapolis Sculpture Garden.
Bon Iver
The Revolution
Benjamin Booker
Car Seat Headrest
Margaret Glaspy
Dead Man Winter
Bruise Violet
Dwynell Roland

2018
Rock the Garden 2018 was held on June 16.
Father John Misty
Low Cut Connie
Chastity Brown
U.S. Girls
Nikki Lane
Kamasi Washington
P.O.S (rapper)
Feist (singer)

2019
Rock the Garden 2019 was held on June 29.

The National
Courtney Barnett
X
Heart Bones (Sabrina Ellis and Har Mar Superstar)
Bad Bad Hats
Dem Atlas
Adia Victoria
The Beths

2020
Rock the Garden 2020 and 2021 have been cancelled due to the COVID-19 pandemic.

2022
Rock the Garden 2022 was held on June 11.

Nathaniel Rateliff & The Night Sweats
Sleater-Kinney
LOW
DāM-FunK
Divide and Dissolve
Beabadoobee
Bombino

References

External links
Walker Art Center homepage
"Summers of Rock: A Definitive History of Rock the Garden", Walker Art Center homepage, July 20, 2017
"The Official Rock the Garden 2016 Lineup", Walker Art Center, April 5, 2016
"A history of Rock the Garden (old and Current)", Minneapolis Star Tribune, June 16, 2011
"Crowd, sun push Rock the Garden to full bloom", Minneapolis Star Tribune, June 20, 2009
"Rock the Garden: 10,000 Decemberists fans can't be wrong", Twin Cities Daily Planet, June 22, 2009
"Is Rock the Garden too Current?", Minneapolis Star Tribune, June 19, 2008

Rock festivals in the United States
Culture of Minneapolis
Tourist attractions in Minneapolis
Music festivals in Minnesota
Indie rock festivals